The Flying Classroom is a 1954 West German family comedy film directed by Kurt Hoffmann and starring Paul Dahlke, Heliane Bei and Paul Klinger. It is an adaptation of the 1933 novel The Flying Classroom by Erich Kästner.

It was made at the Bavaria Studios in Munich. The film's sets were designed by the art directors Kurt Herlth and Robert Herlth. It was shot on location in Bavaria and Tyrol.

Cast
 Paul Dahlke as Justus
 Heliane Bei as Schwester Beate
 Paul Klinger as Der Nichtraucher
 Erich Ponto as Der Sanitätsrat
 Bruno Hübner as Prof. Kreuzkamm
 Herbert Kroll as Direktor Grünkern
 Rudolf Vogel as Friseur Krüger
 Willy Reichert as Martins Vater
 Ruth Hausmeister as Martins Mutter
 Arno Ebert as Johnnys Vater
 Peter Vogel as Der schöne Theodor
 Peter Tost as Martin
 Peter Kraus as Johnny
 Bert Brandt as Matz
 Knut Mahlke as Uli
 Axel Arens as Sebastian
 Michael Verhoeven as Ferdinand
 Bernhard von der Planitz as Egerland
 Michael von Welser as Kreuzkamm jr.

References

Bibliography 
 Hans-Michael Bock and Tim Bergfelder. The Concise Cinegraph: An Encyclopedia of German Cinema. Berghahn Books, 2009.

External links 
 

1954 films
1954 comedy films
German comedy films
West German films
1950s German-language films
Films directed by Kurt Hoffmann 
Films based on children's books
Films based on German novels
Films based on works by Erich Kästner
Films set in schools
Films set in boarding schools
1950s high school films
Films shot at Bavaria Studios
German black-and-white films
1950s German films